Platysemaphora is a monotypic moth genus belonging to the subfamily Tortricinae of the family Tortricidae. Its only species, Platysemaphora rubiginosa, is found on Madagascar. Both the genus and species were first described by Alexey Diakonoff in 1960.

See also
List of Tortricidae genera

References

 Diakonoff, A. (1960). Verhandelingen der Koninklijke Nederlandse Akademie van Wetenschappen. (2) 53 (2): 119.
 Brown, John W. (2005). World Catalogue of Insects. 5.

External links
Tortricid.net

Archipini
Monotypic moth genera
Moths described in 1960
Moths of Madagascar
Tortricidae genera